John Newcombe was the defending champion but lost in the second round to Vijay Amritraj.

Stan Smith won in the final 7–6, 6–2 against Robert Lutz.

Seeds

  Ken Rosewall (third round)
  John Newcombe (second round)
  Tony Roche (third round)
  John Alexander (quarterfinals)
  Raúl Ramírez (third round)
  Harold Solomon (first round)
  Cliff Richey (third round)
  Brian Gottfried (semifinals)

Draw

Finals

Top half

Section 1

Section 2

Bottom half

Section 3

Section 4

External links
 1975 Custom Credit Indoor Tennis Tournament draw

Singles